Raisa Katyukova-Smekhnova (born September 16, 1950 in Kaltan, Kemerovo) is a retired long-distance runner from the Soviet Union, who won the bronze medal at the 1983 World Championships in Helsinki, Finland, behind Norway's Grete Waitz and USA's Marianne Dickerson. She won the Soviet title in the women's marathon in 1985.

Achievements

References
  
 sports-reference

1950 births
Living people
Belarusian female long-distance runners
Soviet female long-distance runners
Russian female long-distance runners
Athletes (track and field) at the 1976 Summer Olympics
Athletes (track and field) at the 1988 Summer Olympics
Olympic athletes of the Soviet Union
Place of birth missing (living people)
World Athletics Championships medalists
World Athletics Championships athletes for the Soviet Union
Friendship Games medalists in athletics
People from Kaltan
Sportspeople from Kemerovo Oblast